Semender is an urban locality (an urban-type settlement) under the administrative jurisdiction of Kirovsky City District of the City of Makhachkala in the Republic of Dagestan, Russia. As of the 2010 Census, its population was 13,677.

History
It was established as an urban-type settlement in 1999.

Administrative and municipal status
Within the framework of administrative divisions, the urban-type settlement of Semender is in jurisdiction of Kirovsky City District of the City of Makhachkala. Within the framework of municipal divisions, Semender is a part of Makhachkala Urban Okrug.

References

Notes

Sources

Urban-type settlements in the Republic of Dagestan